Ehrenberg Castle is a castle located in Reutte in Tyrol, Austria.

Highline179

In 2014, the world's longest pedestrian suspension bridge was completed between the Ehrenberg Castle ruins and Fort Claudia, spanning the strategically important pass that these two structures were in part meant to guard.

References

External links

 Burgenwelt Ehrenberg – Official Site

Castles in Tyrol (state)
Museums in Tyrol (state)
History museums in Austria